Sir Michael John Burton  (born 12 November 1946), styled Mr Justice Burton, is a former judge in the High Court of England and Wales. He was the President of the Investigatory Powers Tribunal between October 2013 and September 2018, having been vice-president since its inception in 2000, the Chair of the Central Arbitration Committee for over 17 years (2000 to 2017) and the former President of the Employment Appeal Tribunal (2002–2005), which was reformed under his presidency.

He was educated at Eton College and Balliol College, Oxford.

Prior to his judicial appointment, in 1998, he was head of Littleton Chambers (1991–1998). He was appointed KC in 1984.

Until January 2011 Burton was Chairman of the High Court Judges Association and served as Treasurer of Gray's Inn in 2012.

He was appointed Knight Grand Cross of the Order of the British Empire (GBE) in the 2019 Birthday Honours.

Sir Michael is the figurehead of the Investigatory Powers Tribunal since its
inception in 2000 and has played a pivotal role in the UK's world-leading oversight of
its security and intelligence agencies. He has ruled on landmark cases that have had a considerable
impact on the landscape of investigatory powers. He has adapted the Tribunal to
deal with new, wide-ranging counter-terrorism powers and to ensure that it is
working within the law.

He is a widower with four daughters and ten grandchildren. He founded the Corinne Burton Memorial Trust in 1992 in
memory of his late wife, and for the past 26 years the Trust has funded art therapy for
cancer patients as well as providing support for students wanting to pursue this field. Most notably, he has set up a scholarship fund at Goldsmiths College, London
University which is awarded every year to a student who wishes to study art
psychotherapy with a focus on cancer care. As Chair of the Trust, he maintains an active role in its funding projects, outreach activities and strategic direction.

References 

1946 births
Living people
People educated at Eton College
Alumni of Balliol College, Oxford
Queen's Bench Division judges
Knights Bachelor
British King's Counsel
Knights Grand Cross of the Order of the British Empire
21st-century English judges